For Tracy Hyde is a Japanese shoegaze band, formed in 2012. The group started as the solo project of Natsubot, real name Azusa Suga, before adding more members over time. It currently consists of guitarist Suga, singer and guitarist Eureka, bassist Mav, and drummer Sougou. The band's music is primarily written by Suga.

History

2010s 
The band released their debut album, "Film bleu", on December 2, 2016, through P-Vine Records. The album had two release parties, one in Tokyo and one in Osaka, featuring artists including dotstokyo, who the band has composed songs for. They released their next album, "he(r)art", under a year later on November 2, 2017. Also in 2017, the band was named as one of Space Shower's New Force artists. In 2018, Sougou joined the band, replacing Marcie.

The band released their third album, "New Young City", on September 4, 2019. The album was heavily inspired by Shibuya-kei. They toured the album through Asia, including countries like the Philippines and Singapore.

2020s 
The band's fourth album, "Ethernity", was released on February 17, 2021. In May 2022, they released a split single with shoegaze idol group RAY, whose album "Green" was produced by Suga. In October 2022, the band played at the Baybeats festival in Singapore. On December 14, 2022, the band released their fifth album "Hotel Insomnia". The album received praise from Pitchfork and NPR. The band announced a 2023 Japan tour for the album, featuring a co-headline with former singer Lovely Summer Chan. On January 5, 2023, the band announced they would be disbanding following a final concert on March 25.

Discography

Studio Albums 
 2016: Film bleu 
 2017: he(r)art
 2019: New Young City
 2021: Ethernity
 2022: Hotel Insomnia

EPs 
 2012: Juniper and Lamplight
 2013: Satellite Lovers
 2013: All About Ivy
 2014: In Fear of Love
 2014: Born to Be Breathtaken

References 

Musical groups from Tokyo
Musical groups established in 2012
Japanese rock music groups
P-Vine Records artists
Shoegazing musical groups
Musical groups disestablished in 2023